Isabel Brand (born 23 June 1996) is a Guatemalan modern pentathlete. She has qualified for the 2016 Summer Olympics.

References

External links 
 

1996 births
Living people
Guatemalan female modern pentathletes
Modern pentathletes at the 2016 Summer Olympics
Olympic modern pentathletes of Guatemala
Modern pentathletes at the 2014 Summer Youth Olympics
Modern pentathletes at the 2015 Pan American Games
Pan American Games competitors for Guatemala